"One Last Time" is a song recorded by American country music artist Dusty Drake.  It was released in March 2003 as the second single from the album Dusty Drake.  The song reached number 26 on the Billboard Hot Country Singles & Tracks chart.  The song was written by Kerry Kurt Phillips and Patrick Jason Matthews.

Content
The song is a memorial to the passengers who died in the 9/11 plane crashes. Lyrically, it is framed as a cell phone conversation between a man who is a passenger on one of the planes and his wife.

Critical reception
In a review of Drake's album, Billboard writer Ray Waddell called the song "a powerhouse weeper with a heartrending twist".

Chart performance
"One Last Time" debuted at number 53 on the Billboard Hot Country Songs chart dated for the week ending March 22, 2003.

References

2003 singles
2003 songs
Dusty Drake songs
Songs written by Patrick Jason Matthews
Songs written by Kerry Kurt Phillips
Song recordings produced by Paul Worley
Warner Records singles
Music about the September 11 attacks